The 2019 Tour Colombia was a road cycling stage race that took place in Colombia between 12 and 17 February 2019. It was the second edition of the Tour Colombia, and was rated as a 2.1 event as part of the UCI America Tour. Miguel Angel Lopez won for Team Astana.

Teams
Twenty-eight teams were invited to start the race. These included six UCI WorldTeams, 7 UCI Professional Continental teams, 12 UCI Continental teams and three national teams. Each team had a maximum of six riders:

Route

Stages

Stage 1

Stage 2

Stage 3

Stage 4

Stage 5

Stage 6

Final standings

References

External links

2019
2019 UCI America Tour
2019 in Colombian sport
February 2019 sports events in South America